Benjamin Arvola Notkevich (born 9 February 1993 in Oslo) is a Norwegian chess player.

Chess career
He achieved the title International Master in 2017, and was awarded the Grandmaster title in 2018.
 
Notkevich achieved his first Grandmaster norm in Fagernes in April 2017, with subsequent norms in Fagernes in April 2018 and in the 43rd Chess Olympiad in Batumi in October 2018.

References

Norwegian chess players
Chess grandmasters
1993 births
Living people